Devils Island, Devil's Island or Devil Island may refer to:

Places

Antarctica 
 Devil Island

Canada 
 Devil Island (Lake Temagami), Ontario
 Devils Island (Nova Scotia)
 Devil's Island, former name for King Island (Saskatchewan)

French Guiana 
 Devil's Island, former penal colony
 Devil's Island (Kourou), island of the Salvation's Islands

Greenland 
 Djævleøen (Devil's Island)

United States 
 Devils Island (Wisconsin), one of the Apostle Islands

Other
 Devil's Island (1926 film), silent starring Pauline Frederick and Marian Nixon
 Devil's Island (1939 film), starring Boris Karloff
 Devil's Island (1979 film), Yugoslav film
 Devil's Island (1996 film), Icelandic film
 "Devil's Island", a song from the Megadeth album Peace Sells... but Who's Buying? about the historic French penal colony of the same name.
 "Devil's Island", a song from the Architects album Daybreaker

See also
 Isle of Devils or Devil's Isles, old names for Bermuda
 King of Devil's Island,a 2010 film about Norway's Bastøy Prison